XHNAL-FM is a radio station on 89.5 FM in Tonalá, Chiapas. It is part of the state-owned Radio Chiapas state network and is known as Digital 89.

XHNAL was established in 1994 and is the most powerful radio station in Chiapas.

References

Radio stations in Chiapas
Public radio in Mexico